Huggy Bear were an English riot grrrl band, formed in 1991 and based in Brighton.

History
Evolving in tandem with the Olympia, Washington-based riot grrrl movement led by feminist bands such as Bikini Kill, Huggy Bear called themselves "girl-boy revolutionaries", both in reference to their political philosophy and the gender makeup of their band.

For the majority of their existence, they refused to be photographed or interviewed by mainstream press, nor gave their full names once they began releasing records formally. In spite of a major label bidding war, Huggy Bear stayed with indie label Wiiija.

Their avant-garde debut EP, Rubbing the Impossible to Burst, was released in 1992, and in the same year they began working closely with Bikini Kill as riot grrrl's popularity peaked on both sides of the Atlantic, culminating in a split album on Catcall Records (Huggy Bear) and Kill Rock Stars (Bikini Kill) called Our Troubled Youth/Yeah Yeah Yeah Yeah, the names of the Huggy Bear and Bikini Kill sides, respectively. Huggy Bear then released a series of EPs, which were collected on Taking the Rough with the Smooch. No longer featuring Slade on guitar, Huggy Bear released two more singles and Weaponry Listens to Love in 1994, their first full-length album as well as their final release.

On 14 February 1993, Huggy Bear performed "Her Jazz" on the British television programme, The Word.  After their set, the band stayed in the studio to watch a report on two American models who called themselves "the Barbi Twins".  Huggy Bear and their fans became upset at this and started shouting at the show's presenter Terry Christian.  They were ejected from the studio, and a spokesperson for The Word later claimed that one of the band's friends had "bit the face of a member of our production team." Future Goldblade frontman and editor of music blog Louderthanwar, John Robb was with the band in the studio and said no-one got bitten and the security was heavy-handed and had to be calmed down. The performance was given a Melody Maker cover story, the event being compared to the Sex Pistols' Bill Grundy incident.

Other projects
Members of Huggy Bear also played as the Furbelows. In 1993, Rowley and Johnson released an EP as The Element of Crime on Soul Static Sound records, with members of Linus, Skinned Teen, Sister George and Blood Sausage. Elliott and Johnson also joined Blood Sausage, while Rowley assisted Skinned Teen live and with artwork, and Elliot guested on their 1994 album. 

After leaving Huggy Bear, Hill formed Phantom Pregnancies with Delia from Mambo Taxi and Sean from Wat Tyler. Slade briefly joined I'm Being Good, and then Comet Gain.

In 2014, Jo Johnson released a solo ambient album called Weaving on Further Records.

In 2019, Chris Rowley formed a new band called Adulkt Life with former members of Male Bonding. On 27 November of that year, they played their first show at the Lexington in London. They released their first single and a digital zine on 18 August 2020, "County Pride", on What's Your Rupture?.

Line-up
Niki Eliot:  bass and vocals
Jo Johnson:  guitar and vocals
Karen Hill:  drums and piano
Chris Rowley:  vocals, trumpet and piano
Jon Slade:  guitar

Discography

Albums
Our Troubled Youth (Huggy Bear), mini LP split with Yeah Yeah Yeah Yeah (Bikini Kill), 8 March '93, CATCALL / Kill Rock Stars 206
Weaponry Listens to Love, LP/CD, 21 Nov '94, WIIIJA

Compilations
We Bitched, cass, '92, WIIIJA [demo recordings, inc. exclusive tracks Coral Kill; Sour Creamer Stag, Bumper Sticker, Cherry Cherry]
Huggy Nation / Kisser Boy Kisser Girl, cass, '92, Soul Static Sound [V/A compilation inc. Huggy Bear & side projects]
Taking the Rough with the Smooch, LP/CD, '93, KILL ROCK STARS/WIIIJA [Compilation of WIIIJA 18/WIIIJA 23/Trouble 001]
For Every Wolf That Roams, cass, '94, Famous Monsters of Filmland [Live at the Square, Harlow]

Singles and EPs
Rubbing the Impossible to Burst 7", SEPT'92, WIIIJA 16, Ltd edition of 2000 pressed [Katholic Kunt; High Street Jupiter Supercone // Snail Messenger Loss; Single Bullets]
Kiss Curl for the Kid's Lib Guerrillas, 7", DEC'92, WIIIJA 18 [Derwin; Sizzlemeet // Concrete Life; Carnt Kiss]
"14 February" / "Into the Mission" – one-sided 7" given out at a Brighton gig, 14.2.93
Her Jazz, 7", 93, CATCALL/WIIIJA – Trouble001 [Her Jazz // Prayer; Pro No From Now]
Shimmies in the Super 8, double 7", 4 songs of Huggy Bear, 2 of Darlin', 1 of COLM, 1 of Stereolab, 1993, DUOPHONIC, Ltd edition of 800 [Trafalgar Square; Godziller; More Music From Bells; Snow White, Rose Red]
Don't Die, 7", AUG'93, WIIIJA 23 [Dissthentic Penetration; Teen Tighterns; No Sleep // Shaved Pussy Poetry; Pansy Twist]
Long Distance Lovers, 7", '94, GRAVITY No. 9 [Steppin on Bugs; Limit 2 Surf // Tuff Lovin; Code Fucker]
Main Squeeze, miniCD, '94, FELLAHEEN RECORDS Jack 011-2 [Children Absent From Heaven Says; Red Flipper No. 2; My Best Kiss]

References

External links

Huggy Bear videos at World News
Archive fansite
Huggy Nation – archive fansite
Huggy Bear's last interview, Nov 1994
Huggy Bear gig listing
WIIIJA records biog
Allmusic biog
Taking the Rough with the Smooch review
Weaponry LP review – Allmusic
Weaponry LP review – Furia
Weaponry LP review – Punknews
Huggy Bear tribute – The Guardian, 2008

Musical groups established in 1991
Musical groups disestablished in 1994
Kill Rock Stars artists
English punk rock groups
Riot grrrl bands
Musical groups from Brighton and Hove
1991 establishments in England
1994 disestablishments in England
Underground punk scene in the United Kingdom